WCLG may refer to:

 WCLG (AM), a radio station (1300 AM) licensed to Morgantown, West Virginia, United States
 WCLG-FM, a radio station (100.1 FM) licensed to Morgantown, West Virginia

See also
 KCLG (disambiguation)
 CLG (disambiguation)